Beya Bouabdallah (born December 24, 1944) is a former Tunisian female basketball player, female handball player, female volleyball player and female athletics player.

External links
Résultats des Jeux méditerranéns 1967 (Comité international des Jeux méditerranéens)

References

1944 births
Living people
Tunisian women's basketball players
Tunisian women's volleyball players
Tunisian female handball players
Tunisian female javelin throwers
Tunisian female shot putters
Mediterranean Games medalists in athletics
Mediterranean Games gold medalists for Tunisia
Mediterranean Games silver medalists for Tunisia
Athletes (track and field) at the 1967 Mediterranean Games
20th-century Tunisian women
21st-century Tunisian women